The Texas Southern Tigers is the college football team representing Texas Southern University, a historically black university (HBCU) in Houston. The Tigers play in the NCAA's Division I FCS as a member of the Southwestern Athletic Conference (SWAC), a conference whose members are all HBCUs. In 2012, the Tigers moved into the new Shell Energy Stadium, built for the city's Major League Soccer team, the Houston Dynamo.  It replaced the Alexander Durley Sports Complex as the home of Tiger football.

History

Classifications
 1952–1972: NCAA College Division
 1952–1969: NAIA
 1970–1984: NAIA Division I
 1973–1976: NCAA Division II
 1977: NCAA Division I
 1978–present: NCAA Division I-AA/FCS

Conference memberships
 1947–1951: Independent
 1952–1954: Midwest Athletic Association
 1955–present: Southwestern Athletic Conference

Football Classics

Labor Day Classic

The Tigers compete against the Panthers of Prairie View A&M in the Labor Day Classic for the Durley-Nicks Trophy.  The popular football rivalry began in 1946 but the classic was created in 1985.

Texas State Fair Football Showdown

Texas Southern University agreed to a major deal with the city of Dallas and the Texas State Fair to play the Southern University Jaguars in Dallas in 2018 and 2019.  The game will take place in October in the Cotton Bowl Stadium during the Texas State Fair.

TV Broadcasting
In July 2017, Texas Southern renewed their deal with AT&T SportsNet (formerly ROOT Sports Southwest) to televise all home football games.  The cable channel reaches over 13 million households.

Championships

National

Conference championships

Alumni in the NFL
Over 60 Texas Southern alumni have played in the NFL or AFL, including:
Michael Strahan°°
Tray Walker
Julius Adams
Melvin Baker
Ken Burrough
Greg Briggs
Ernie Calloway
Arthur Cox
John Douglas
James Ford
Harold Hart
W. K. Hicks
Winston Hill°°
Ernie Holmes
Kevin Johnson
Brett Maxie
Will Moore
Cortez Hankton
Jim Sorey
John White
Jim Young
Darvin Kidsy
Joseph Rogers
Oliver Celestine
Andy Olemgbe
Joey Jamison
°° Pro Football Hall of Fame inductee

2012 NCAA sanctions
In October 2012, the NCAA found Texas Southern University guilty of repeated rules violations in 13 sports over a seven-year period from 2005 to 2012. The most serious violations occurred within the football and men's basketball programs, involving academic fraud, illicit benefits given to student athletes, lying on the part of coaches, and lying to the NCAA about previously self-imposed sanctions.

Prior to the NCAA's verdict, the school had taken numerous corrective measures—including the April 2011 firing of football coach Johnnie Cole (2010 SWAC Football Coach of the Year) and vacating every game that the Tiger football team had won from 2006 to 2010 - including the 2010 SWAC Championship, their first championship in 42 years.

The NCAA banned TSU's football team from the 2013 and 2014 postseason.

See also
 List of black college football classics
 Ocean of Soul

References

External links
 

 
American football teams established in 1947
1947 establishments in Texas